Anthrenus maculatus is a species of carpet beetle in the family Dermestidae. It is found in North America.

References

Further reading

 
 

Anthrenus
Articles created by Qbugbot

Beetles described in 1798